Kevin Blatt "KB" is an American fixer known for releasing the Paris Hilton sex tape 1 Night in Paris in 2003.

Work

Kevin Blatt was born in Cleveland, Ohio to a Jewish family and worked in the online adult entertainment industry as a marketing and public relations specialist. Working with companies like Mindgeek, Vivid Video, and Pornstar.com. Since then Blatt has worked on negotiations and distributions of sex tapes for Cameron Diaz, Colin Farrell, Kim Kardashian, Mischa Barton, Tila Tequila, Verne Troyer from Austin Powers and Kevin Hart.

Film and radio

Blatt featured in the theatrically released 2006 documentary “American Cannibal: The Road to Reality.” 

Blatt is also featured in Amazon Studio's 2019 documentary, “Generation Wealth.”

Blatt, along with his brother Darren, were co-promoters of the Players Ball Party, a “Pimp and Ho themed” Ball that was held in Las Vegas over the CES/ AVN Trade show weekend. The party featured many notable rap and hip-hop artists.

Blatt has appeared on The Howard Stern Show, Access Hollywood, Entertainment Tonight, in The Wall Street Journal, The New York Times, Rolling Stone, Vice, CNN, ABC.com, ABC News 20/20, Wired, MSNBC, Dr. Phil, Your Mom's House, The Obermann Report, and NY Post. Kevin also featured as a regular guest on the AXS TV show “Top Ten Revealed” with Katie Daryl
He is a regular guest discussing the underside of Hollywood.

Blatt previously was a co-host of the comedy podcast, “Blow The Whistle feat Too Short and KB.” Kevin's co-host on the show was Bay Area rapper, Too Short.

Current work

Blatt's inside knowledge about Hollywood's underside has led to him being a frequent guest on many podcasts; he is known for his outrageous stories. Blatt presently works as a "fixer" for Hollywood celebrities and as a media broker for tabloid news outlets. He also runs Profile Defenders, a reputation repair firm.

References

1969 births
Living people
People from Cleveland